Cánshén (Chinese: , "Silkworm God") or Cánwáng ( "Silkworm Ruler") is the deity of silkworm and sericulture in Chinese religion. There are two main Canshen, who are two deified mytho-historical personalities who contributed to the invention and diffusion of sericulture in China.

 Cánmǔ (the "Silkworm Mother"), is a goddess whose cult is related to that of Houtu (the "Queen of the Earth") and to that of the Sanxiao ("Three Skies") goddesses. She is also called Cángū ( the "Silkworm Maiden [or Lady]"), and is identified as Léizǔ, the wife of Huangdi, the deity of the centre of the cosmos and god progenitor of all the Chinese. The worship of Canmu is typical of central-northern and eastern China.
 Qīngyīshén ( the "Bluegreen-Clad God") is the same as Cáncóng ( the "Silkworm Twig"), the first ruler and ancestor of the Shu kingdom, and promoter of sericulture among his people. He was worshipped in Sichuan, the modern Chinese province descending from the Shu kingdom.

See also
 Chinese gods and immortals
 Chinese folk religion

Citations

References

Sources
 
 

Chinese deities
Sericulture
Silk production